Constituent Assembly elections were held in Guatemala in June 1935. Following the election, Jorge Ubico’s presidential term was extended to 15 March 1943 by the Assembly on 10 July 1935.

References

Elections in Guatemala
Guatemala
1935 in Guatemala
Election and referendum articles with incomplete results